The southern pigfish (Congiopodus leucopaecilus) is a species of marine ray-finned fish belonging to the family Congiopodidae, the horsefishes or pigfishes. It is found in the waters off southern Australia and New Zealand.

Taxonomy
The Southern pigfish was first formally described in 1846 as Agriopus leucopaecilus by the Scottish naval surgeon, naturalist and Arctic explorer John Richardson with the type locality given as "South Australian seas", although this was probably New Zealand. The specific name combines leuco, meaning "white", and poecilius, meaning "mottled", an allusion to the purplish-white spots and blotches on the body of this fish.

Description
The southern pigfish has smooth skin and no spines in the anal fin. The profile of the head is nearly vertical between the eye and the origin of the dorsal fin. The overall colour of the body is brownish above and cream below marked with a row of pale and dark blotches along the flanks while the remainder of the body is blotched.

Distribution and habitat
The Southern pigfish is found in the southwestern Pacific Ocean. It is known to occur in the waters off New Zealand, where it is rare north of the Cook Strait, and has been reported from southern  Australia but there are no specimens collected in Australian waters in Australian museums.

Biology
The Southern pigfish is a sedentary species which swims slowly and rests on the substrate for long periods. The long snout is used to probe in crevices, seaweed and sand to find the crabs, worms, and other benthic invertebrates that this species feeds on.

References

 
 Ayling, T. & G. Cox. Collins Guide to the Sea Fishes of New Zealand. William Collins Publishers Ltd, Auckland, New Zealand. 1982. 

Congiopodus
Fish described in 1846
Taxa named by John Richardson (naturalist)